Torquay Airport is a privately owned airfield situated at 325 Blackgate Rd, Torquay, Victoria, Australia.

Torquay Airport is home to Tiger Moth World and Australian Skydive. (ICAO: YTQY)

Other airports in the area are at Barwon Heads (ICAO: YBRS) and Avalon Airport.

External links
 Tiger Moth World - Pilot information

Airports in Victoria (Australia)